Jacek Zdzisław Siewiera (April 27, 1984 in Wrocław) is a Polish army officer, medical doctor and lawyer. A doctor of philosophy in medical science, an expert in anaesthesiology and intensive therapy. University of Oxford alumnus. The organizer and first head of the Hyperbaric Medicine Clinic of the Military Medical Institute. The founder of the Rescue Center. Since 2022 he serves as a Head of the National Security Bureau.

Education and career 

He completed full-time studies at the faculty of medicine of the Piastów Śląskich Medical University in Wrocław and five-year part-time studies in law at the Faculty of  Law and Economics of the University of Wrocław and doctoral studies at the Forensic Medicine Chair of the Medical University in Wrocław. After defense of doctoral dissertation at the Forensic Medicine Chair of the Piastów Śląskich Medical University in Wrocław he started military service. He is the author of the first textbook in Poland dedicated to limitations of life support technologies and titled Futile medial treatment for medical doctors and lawyers. Then he commenced studies in the area of strategy and innovation at the University of Oxford and graduated with distinction.

In 2012 he was awarded with the Medal for Sacrifice and Courage by the President of the Republic of Poland Bronisław Komorowski upon request of the Voivode of Lower Silesia Region for merit in saving human lives (for actions undertaken during the disaster within the premises of the Katowice International Fair in 2006).

In 2017 in the Clinical Ward of Hyperbaric Medicine of the Military Medical Institute, which he established, he undertook a rescue hyperbaric treatment of a pilot of a MIG29 fighter jet, which failed during flight. This was the world's first publicized case of successful recovery from high-altitude decompression sickness owing to hyperbaric treatment and cardiopulmonary bypass. The treatment procedure entailed a risk to the medical doctor's life and health, for which in 2018 he was awarded with the Cross of Merit for Bravery by the President of the Republic of Poland, Andrzej Duda, and also with the „Portrait of Polish Medicine”. As a result of actions aimed to combat the SARS CoV2 epidemic in the period of peak incidence of COVID-19 infections in the United States, he was awarded with the Illinois Military Medal of Merit.

Missions 

 In 2020, during the COVID-19 pandemic he was the Commander of the Polish Military and Civilian Mission to Lombardy from March 30 to April 9, 2020, in the period of peak incidence of SARS-CoV-2 infections in Northern Italy
 In April 2020 he was the Commander of the Polish Military Medical Mission to the United States. deployed after a telephone conversation between President of Poland and of the United States.

References 

Polish soldiers
Polish medical researchers
1984 births
Living people